I Blocks are a design of public housing in Hong Kong. It is mainly divided into three variants: Single I, Double I, and Triple I. Only a few estates currently have I blocks as of today. (1981-1983)

Variants 
The I block can be divided into three variants: Single I, Double I, and Triple I.

Etymology 
The building looks like the letter I. There are three wings - two long and one at the middle. It can be modular by connecting another or two more I blocks. This gave birth of Double I and Triple I.

Naming 
Unlike other blocks, Double I blocks are only given one name. Such examples include Mei Fung House in Mei Lam Estate and Shek To House in Shek Wai Kok Estate.

Location 
The I blocks take up a large amount of space. Therefore, most are found in the new towns of Sha Tin, Kwun Tong, Sham Shui Po, and Tsuen Wan.

History 
The first I blocks was completed in 1981, located at Sun Tin Wai Estate. (Shing Wai House, Foo Wai House, Yan Wai House, Fung Wai House, Wing Wai House) The first Double I buildings are located at Shun Tin Estate, completed about the same as shown above. The last I blocks to be built are located at Chak On Estate, completed in 1983.

Overview 
Usually, the height of I blocks may vary. (14-21 stories) Only medium and large units are provided inside the block. (32-39 sqm) Therefore, in public housing estates, it is built with Old Slab to balance the size of units.

Due to the I block taking a lot of space and units focusing on only one size, the I block was stopped being built in future projects. Therefore, few currently have I blocks as of today.

 Single I: Single I block contains 27 units per floor.
 Double I: Double I block contains 54 units per floor.
 Triple I: Triple I block contains 81 units per floor.

List of blocks

See also 
 Types of public housing estate blocks in Hong Kong
H Block (Hong Kong)

References

External links 
Single I Floor Plan
Public housing in Hong Kong